Moment (translit. Tren) is a 1978 Yugoslav war film directed by Stole Janković. It was entered into the 11th Moscow International Film Festival where Bata Živojinović won the award for Best Actor.

Cast
 Velimir 'Bata' Zivojinovic as Arsen
 Radko Polič as Dositej
 Pavle Vuisić as Ljuba Kvrga
 Svjetlana Knezević as Slovenian Woman
 Peter Carsten as The German from Vrsac
 Marinko Šebez as Jovan Grabljanovic-Isus
 Dragan Nikolić as Novak
 Vesna Malohodžić as Novak's Girlfriend
 Dušan Janićijević as Café Owner

References

External links
 

1978 films
1970s war films
Yugoslav war films
1970s Serbian-language films
Films set in Yugoslavia
War films set in Partisan Yugoslavia
Serbian war films
Yugoslav World War II films
Serbian World War II films